The Archer was a British cyclecar designed by M Archer and made in 1920. 

It was powered by a two-cylinder JAP engine rated at 8/10 hp. The two seats were placed one behind the other.

The designer was more famous as the inventor of a trench mortar.

See also
 List of car manufacturers of the United Kingdom

Vintage vehicles
Defunct motor vehicle manufacturers of the United Kingdom
Cyclecars
Vehicle manufacturing companies established in 1920